Fame was built by Matthew Smith at Calcutta in 1803. In 1803 her managing owners were Archer and Smith. On 27 July 1807 Fame was lost on the Eastern Sea Reef. Captain Joseph Latour and all aboard took to her boats and were saved.

Citations

References
 
 

1803 ships
British ships built in India
Age of Sail merchant ships of England
Maritime incidents in 1807
Shipwrecks